Blue Sulphur Springs is an unincorporated community in Greenbrier County, West Virginia, United States. Blue Sulphur Springs is north of Alderson. It is named for a mineral spring near the original town site, distinguishing it from the larger and better-known White Sulphur Springs in the same county. It was the site of the Blue Sulphur Springs Resort, of which only the pavilion remains.

References

Unincorporated communities in Greenbrier County, West Virginia
Spa towns in West Virginia
Unincorporated communities in West Virginia